This is a list of electoral results for the Electoral district of Ballarat East in Victorian state elections.

Members for Ballarat East

Election results

Elections in the 2010s

Elections in the 2000s

Elections in the 1990s

Elections in the 1920s

Elections in the 1910s

 Two party preferred vote was estimated.

References

 

Victoria (Australia) state electoral results by district